Mystery guest may refer to:

 An unknown guest star (usually on a television series)
 A mystery shopper for hotels, that is, an individual employed by hotel rating organizations to pose as a lodger to evaluate the quality of a hotel
 Mystery Guest (round), in the television game show What's My Line?
 "Mystery Guest", 1990 season 3 episode of the animated television series Garfiend and Friends
 "Mystery Guest", a segment on the animated television series Liberty's Kids
 "The Mystery Guest", 2011 episode of the reality television series Rocco's Dinner Party
 Mystery Guest (album), 2008 Taiwanese album by Yoga Lin

See also
 Mystery (disambiguation)
 Guest (disambiguation)